Luckey Hospital is a historic hospital building located in Noble Township, Noble County, Indiana.  It was built in 1929, and is a three-story, tall brick building with an attached two-story section. It has a tall parapet and rests on a full basement. The building housed a private medical facility until 1961 and now houses a museum.

It was listed on the National Register of Historic Places in 2013.

References

History museums in Indiana
Hospital buildings on the National Register of Historic Places in Indiana
Hospital buildings completed in 1929
Buildings and structures in Noble County, Indiana
National Register of Historic Places in Noble County, Indiana